Nation TV may refer to:
Nation TV, now NTV (Kenyan TV channel), a Kenyan television station
Nation TV (Thailand), a Thai television station